Miren Lazkano Zuriarrain (born 16 June 1997) is a Spanish slalom canoeist who has competed at the international level since 2012.

She won a silver medal in the C1 team event at the 2021 World Championships in Bratislava. She also became the European Champion in the C1 event in 2021 and won a bronze medal in the C1 team event in 2018.

Lazkano finished 7th in the 2021 World Cup overall standings, making the final at the last two rounds.

World Cup individual podiums

References

External links

Living people
Spanish female canoeists
1997 births
Medalists at the ICF Canoe Slalom World Championships
Sportspeople from San Sebastián
21st-century Spanish women